BD-10°3166 b is an extrasolar planet approximately 268 light-years away in the constellation of Crater. This planet is a so-called "Hot Jupiter," a planet that orbits its parent star in a very close orbit. Distance to the star is less than 1/20th Earth's distance from the Sun. No transits by the planet have been detected, so the planet's orbital plane cannot be exactly aligned with our direction of view.

References

External links
 
 

Exoplanets discovered in 2000
Crater (constellation)
Hot Jupiters
Giant planets
Exoplanets detected by radial velocity